John Forrest, CB, QHP (20 June 1804, Stirling, Scotland – 10 December 1865, Bath, England) was a British military medical officer.

Forrest served in the Army Medical Staff for 36 years supporting the British Army during a number of conflicts including the Crimean War, briefly being in charge of Scutari Hospital where Florence Nightingale was stationed, and was subsequently made an Honorary Physician to the Queen. He was described in the Medical and Surgical Reporter as "One of the most distinguished medical officers of the British Army".

His past revealed, however, that as a medical student, whilst seeking a cadaver to further his understanding of medicine, he was convicted of grave-robbing – although he was later pardoned by the King.

Childhood and education 

John Forrest was born on 20 June 1804 in Stirling, Scotland, the son of John Forrest, a physician, and Elizabeth Glas.

In 1822, when he was a student of medicine at Edinburgh University Forrest was involved in the removal of the body of Mary Wotherspoon from Stirling Churchyard. The crime was discovered and John along with James Shiels, a street sweeper, Daniel Mitchell, a servant and changekeeper, and James McNab, the local gravedigger, were implicated as the culprits.

A trial was held at the Stirling Spring Circuit Court on 19 April 1823; however, Forrest had absconded and was absent from the hearings. He was assumed to be heading for Paris whilst McNab and Mitchel were held prisoners in the Stirling Tolbooth. The court documents do not mention Shiels however. The crime had been discovered when the grave of Mary Wotherspoon, who had been buried a week before, had been observed to be a couple of inches below the surface. A rope was discovered near the surface and digging down to the coffin revealed it had been broken open and the body removed, however the clothes had been thrown back inside.

In McNab's statement he described Forrest as the ring-leader who had approached him a number of times trying to persuade him to assist in the removal of bodies from the church yard, offering him up to four guineas per body. In McNab's role as the church gravedigger he would have held the keys to the church yard which would be of great use in such a crime. Although McNab admitted being with Forrest, Mitchel and Shiels on the night before the crime was discovered, he protested his innocence and claimed the crime was conducted after he left the group.

Mitchel's statement supports the claim that Forrest had offered a number of times three of four guineas for assistance in the removal of bodies from the graveyard. Mitchel also mentions one of Forrest's accomplices being "a tallish man with a great white coat with a number of capes and whom he heard to be called Mr Johnston from Edinburgh". This man was not located and assumed to be a fictitious character.

Mitchel goes on to describe how Forrest had offered him a large amount of whisky and his being intoxicated, he agreed to go with him, McNab and Shiels to the church yard where Mr Johnston gave him a pound note (which he admits he split with Shiels the following day). However, Mitchel denied assisting with the crime, saying he left immediately afterwards.

As all evidence pointed towards Forrest's being the principal offender in the case and that he had absconded, the court decreed that he should be outlawed.

The Lord Advocate also decided that because Forrest was absent, the trial against McNab and Mitchel who had merely been acting as agents was halted pro loco et tempore. In Scots law this phrase refers to a case where the trial is stopped but the prosecution retains the right to bring a fresh indictment against the accused. They were freed from jail; however this incensed the local populace who formed an angry mob and started to riot in the streets. The 77th Regiment were brought down from the Castle to disperse the rioters who fired on the mob in Spittal Street, but no-one was injured, the soldiers intentionally firing over the people's heads. For their own safety McNab and Mitchel had to take refuge in the jail they had just been released from.

Although Forrest had been outlawed, this did not affect his progress in education, and in 1823 he became a licentiate of Royal College of Surgeons of Edinburgh.

On 7 July 1824, Forrest was pardoned by the King. The reasons are not clearly documented, only referring to John Forrest's contrition of the crime and "favourable circumstances".

Forrest continued his education, and in 1825 was awarded a Doctorate from Edinburgh University. His dissertation, written in Latin, was on the subject of gangrene.

Early military career 

Much of Forrest's military career is documented in his obituary in the British Medical Journal:

Forrest joined the British Army as a Hospital Assistant on 10 November 1825. Through his diligence he was promoted to Assistant Surgeon into the 20th Regiment of the Foot on 9 February 1826. This period of history was relatively peaceful, and regiments were posted around the British Colonies to ensure order was maintained. The 20th Regiment was based in India and Forrest was involved in the expedition against the Rajah of Kolapore in 1827.

On 3 September 1829 Forrest was transferred into the 23rd Regiment of Foot where he was attached until 11 October 1831 when he transferred to the 8th West India Regiment of Foot.

Forrest transferred into the hospital staff in St. Ninians, Scotland, on 9 July 1832 where he remained for a number of years. There he married, on 7 March 1839, Ann Mclachlan  daughter of Captain Donald Mclachlan. The following month they left Stirling with Captain Donald and family in the barque Arione and journeyed to the Cape of Good Hope, South Africa where Forrest and his new wife disembarked. Her father and family continued to Australia reaching Port Phillip towards the end of 1839 where they settled.

Forrest was promoted to surgeon of the 2nd class into the 75th Regiment of Foot where he was attached from 2 July 1841 until 13 May 1842 when he transferred to the hospital staff in Cape Town.

Whilst in Cape Town, Forrest and his wife Ann had two children, Mary Anne (born 1840) and John (born 2 February 1841). However, Ann died soon after on 1 August 1842 and was buried at St George’s Anglican Church, Cape Town on 2 August 1842.

Forrest's role as hospital staff in Cape Town included involvement in the expedition against the insurgent Boers beyond the Orange River in 1845, and in the Kaffir War of 1846, for which he received the South African Medal.

He also became the Medical Attendant to Lady Sarah Lennox (1792–1873), daughter of the Duke of Richmond, and wife of Sir Peregrine Maitland. Sir John Hall describes Forrest in a letter dated 17 January 1847:

On 21 May 1850 Forrest was promoted to Surgeon of the First Class and served as hospital staff in Glasgow and Chatham, Kent.

Crimean War 

On 28 March 1854, Forrest was promoted to Deputy-Inspector of Army Hospitals and on 13 April 1854 was ordered to be in medical charge of the 3rd division of the Eastern army in Gallipoli and Bulgaria, accompanying the expedition to the Crimea on 17 September 1854.

In his capacity of Principal Medical Officer, Forrest was present at the affair of Bulganac, capture of Balaklava, battles of the Alma and Inkerman, and siege of Sebastopol. Forrest was noted in Lord Raglan's despatch after the Battle of Inkerman, "for his able exertions, as deserving to be most honourably mentioned".

In December 1854, he was posted to Scutari hospital. One of the junior doctors in his division, George Lawson, wrote a letter home describing his high opinion of Forrest:

It was not long before the extent of the conditions at Scutari became clear to Forrest, as described in his letter to John Hall on 4 January:

Florence Nightingale, a nurse at Scutari who worked hard to make improvements for the overworked staff against official indifference, wrote of Forrest in her letter to Sidney Herbert on 8 January 1855, stating:

The conditions are revealed also in a letter dated 16 January from Forrest to John Hall:

Forrest had contracted a severe illness and unable to remain at his post he resigned. His letter to Hall on 23 January stated:

Forrest was granted a medical certificate and returned to England on 26 January 1855.

Forrest was awarded the Crimea Medal with three clasps which was personally presented to him by Queen Victoria at the presentation ceremony on Horse Guards Parade, London, 18 May 1855. He was also awarded the Turkish Crimea Medal.

Later career 

Forrest spent much of the remaining time in service as Principal Medical Officer stationed in Malta. He was made an Ordinary Member of the Military Division of the Third Class (Companion of the Order of the Bath) on 5 February 1856 and received the fourth-class Order of the Medjidie on 2 March 1858 for his efforts in the Crimean War.

Forrest remarried on 12 August 1858 in Gibraltar, Emma Jenkin, daughter of George H. Jenkin.

He was promoted to Inspector-General of Army Hospitals on 31 December 1858 and shortly after on 16 November 1859 was given the title Honorary Physician to the Queen.

In 1860, the hospital at Villa Spinola in St. Julian's was adapted into a 42-bed army hospital to serve the newly opened barracks at Pembroke and by serving as a sanatorium to absorb some of the overflow from Valletta General Hospital. This hospital was named Forrest Hospital after Forrest.

Forrest died at 10 Queens Parade in Bath, Somerset, on 10 December 1865, leaving £8,000 to his daughter Mary Anne, £5,000 to his second wife Emma, and the remaining £5,000 of his estate to his son John. He is buried at Locksbrook Cemetery, Bath.

Career timeline

Notes

References 

1804 births
1865 deaths
Companions of the Order of the Bath
Alumni of the University of Edinburgh
Military personnel from Stirling
British Army regimental surgeons
Recipients of British royal pardons
British Army personnel of the Crimean War
West India Regiment officers
Recipients of the Order of the Medjidie, 4th class